Hugh Stewart (May 15, 1861 – February 12, 1933) was a Canadian politician. He served in the Legislative Assembly of British Columbia from 1916 to 1920 from the electoral district of Comox, a member of the Liberal party.

References

1861 births
1933 deaths